HK Ružinov 99 Bratislava is an ice hockey team in Bratislava, Slovakia. It was founded in 1957.

History
He played for many years in the 1st. Slovak National Hockey League. Since its founding, BEZ-ka has been a base for many excellent players who later landed in Slovan. In 1996 he changed his name to ŠHK Danubia 96 Bratislava and played in the Slovak 1. Liga. It is the second–level ice hockey league in Slovakia. In 1999, the club changed its name to HK Ružinov 99 Bratislava, under which it still operates today.

Honours

Domestic
Slovak 2. Liga
  Winners (3): 1995–96, 2001–02, 2005–06

References

External links
Official website 

Ružinov
Ice hockey clubs established in 1957
Sport in Bratislava
1957 establishments in Czechoslovakia